Herbert Spiegelberg (May 18, 1904 – September 6, 1990) was an American philosopher who played a prominent role in the advancement of phenomenogical philosophy in the United States.

Life

Spiegelberg was born in Strasbourg, in the Alsatian region of northeastern France.  He studied at the universities of Heidelberg, Freiburg, and Munich, where he encountered Edmund Husserl and many others in the vanguard of the European phenomenological movement.  He received his Ph.D. in 1928 from the University of Munich. 
His doctoral dissertation was written under the direction of the phenomenologist Alexander Pfänder and was titled Gesetz und Sittengesetz (Law and Morality).

In 1937 Spiegelberg left the continent and studied for a year in England before emigrating to the United States.  In the U. S., he taught first at Swarthmore College and then at Lawrence University, which later awarded him an honorary doctoral degree.

In 1953-54 and 1955-56 he received grants from the Rockefeller Foundation for the preparation of the first edition of his landmark historical survey, The Phenomenological Movement: A Historical Introduction.

In 1963, he relocated to Washington University in St. Louis, Missouri and remained there until his retirement as Emeritus Professor in 1971.  He also served as visiting professor at the universities of Michigan and Southern California and as Fulbright Lecturer at the University of Munich.

Spiegelberg conducted five influential workshops in phenomenology, during the summers of 1965, 1966, 1967, 1969, and 1972.  The first workshop was supported by a grant from the National Science Foundation and the second by a grant from the Monsanto Company.

In 1981, Washington University established a series of lectures in phenomenology in his honor.  Herbert Spiegelberg died of leukemia, at the age of 86, at his home in St. Louis, Missouri. His collected papers are available in the archives of the Washington University Libraries.

Philosophy

Spiegelberg played a major role in the development of interest in phenomenology in America.

Major works

Books
 

  (2 vols)

  (2 vols)

  768 pages. 

  411 pages. 

  290 pages. 

  239 pages.

  337 pages.

Translations
  98 pages

Secondary sources
  279 pages.

References

External links
Collected papers archive at Washington University Libraries

1904 births
1990 deaths
20th-century American philosophers
Philosophy academics
American consciousness researchers and theorists
Phenomenologists
Washington University in St. Louis faculty
Lawrence University faculty